The Amorous Dentist is a 1983 Australian television film which was the second of four telemovies called Verdict produced by the ABC dramatising real cases (the others being The Dean Case, Who Killed Hannah Jane?, and The Schippan Mystery).

Premise
In 1865, Sydney-based dentist Dr Louis Bertrand falls in love with a patient's wife. When the patient dies he is arrested for murder.

Cast
Robert Grubb as Dr. Louis Bertrand
Juliet Jordan as Maria Kinder
Robin Bowering as Henry Kinder
David Atkins as Alfred Burne
Rhys McConnochie		
Elaine Mangan as Jane Bertrand
Ron Haddrick as Butler

References

External links
The Amorous Dentist at Austlit

The Amorous Dentist at Screen Australia

Australian television films
1983 television films
1983 films
Films directed by Peter Fisk
1980s English-language films
1980s Australian films